Pseudagrion melanicterum, the black-and-yellow sprite, is a species of damselfly in the family Coenagrionidae. It is found in Angola, Benin, Cameroon, Central African Republic, the Republic of the Congo, the Democratic Republic of the Congo, Ivory Coast, Equatorial Guinea, Ghana, Guinea, Kenya, Liberia, Nigeria, Senegal, Sierra Leone, Tanzania, Togo, Uganda, Zambia, possibly Burkina Faso, and possibly Sudan. Its natural habitats are subtropical or tropical moist lowland forests and rivers.

References

Coenagrionidae
Insects described in 1876
Taxonomy articles created by Polbot